
Year 33 BC was either a common year starting on Saturday, Sunday or Monday or a leap year starting on Sunday (link will display the full calendar) of the Julian calendar (the sources differ, see leap year error for further information) and a leap year starting on Saturday of the Proleptic Julian calendar. At the time, it was known as the Year of the Consulship of Octavian and Tullus (or, less frequently, year 721 Ab urbe condita). The denomination 33 BC for this year has been used since the early medieval period, when the Anno Domini calendar era became the prevalent method in Europe for naming years.

Events 
 By place 

 Roman Republic 
 Gaius Julius Caesar Octavian becomes consul for the second time. His partner is Lucius Volcatius Tullus. Octavian delivers a speech; de summa Republica in the Roman Senate, in which he subjects the Donations.
 The second term of the Second Triumvirate expires.
Marcus Vipsanius Agrippa is self demoted to Aedile, and builds the Aqua Julia, one of the aqueducts on which Rome's water supply depends, as well as cleaning the Cloaca Maxima sewerage system.
 Mark Antony annexes the kingdom of Media and arranges the marriage of his son Alexander Helios with princess Iotapa, the daughter of king Artavasdes I.
 The Kinambroi surrender to Octavian.

 China 
 Crown Prince Ao ascends to the throne as Emperor Cheng of Han of the Han Dynasty (until 7 BC).

Births

Deaths 
 July 8 – Yuan of Han, Chinese emperor of the Han Dynasty (b. 75 BC)
 Tiberius Claudius Nero, Roman politician and father of Tiberius (b. 85 BC)

References